Badampudi is a village in Unguturu mandal, located in West Godavari district of the Indian state of Andhra Pradesh.
Badampudi has an excellent road and rail connectivity to the all major cities of India. Badampudi has a famous Kalikrishna ashram which attracts pilgrims from all other states during winter season.

Badampudi has produced so many talents to the nation working in India and abroad at various positions. ZPH School Badampudi which is there since 1975 has produced so many Engineers, Doctors, Teachers, Army Professionals and politicians. You can see lush green paddy fields welcoming you to the village. Badampudi - BPY has its own railway station.

Demographics

 census, Badampudi village has population of 6654 of which 3350 are males while 3304 are females. Average Sex Ratio of Badampudi village is 986 which is lower than Andhra Pradesh state average of 993. Population of children with age 0-6 is 708 which makes up 10.64% of total population of village. Child Sex Ratio for the Badampudi as per census is 1017, higher than Andhra Pradesh average of 939. Literacy rate of Badampudi village was 71.78% compared to 67.02% of Andhra Pradesh.

References

Villages in West Godavari district